Tirumala Tirupati Devasthanams (TTD) is an independent trust which manages the temples including the Tirumala Venkateswara Temple in Andhra Pradesh. The trust oversees the operations and finances of the richest and the most visited religious center in the world. It is also involved in various social, religious, literary and educational activities. TTD is headquartered at Tirupati and employs about 16,000 people.

Establishment and legislative setting
TTD was established in 1932 as a result of the TTD Act of 1932. According to the act administration of the temple was vested in a committee of seven members and overseen by a paid commissioner appointed by the Madras Government. Advising the committee were two advisory councils – one composed of priests and temple administrators to aid the committee with the operations of the Tirumala temple, and another composed of farmers for advice on Tirumala's land and estate transactions.

The Andhra Pradesh Charitable and Hindu Religious Institution and Endowments Act (1969), sections 85 to 91, expanded the provisions of TTD. The number of trustees was expanded from five to eleven with compulsory representation from certain communities. Apart from the responsibilities defined in the previous act, Devasthanam was obliged to promote the study of Indian languages and propagate Hindu Dharma by research, teaching, training and literature creation.

The A.P. Charitable & Hindu Religious Institutions & Endowments Act (1987) superseded the 1979 act. The Board of Trustees' membership was expanded from a maximum of eleven to fifteen and the hereditary rights of temple priests and their right to garner a share of the hundi proceeds were abolished. After increased pressure from the priests over a long period, the AP government made an amendment to the act in 2006, to discontinue these two controversial clauses. It is mandatory for non-Hindus to sign a declaration form before entering the hill temple, stating that they have faith in the presiding deity, Lord Venkateswara.

Temples under TTD administration

Tirumala Tirupati Devasthanams trust primarily manages the administration of Lord Venkateswara Temple, Tirumala. It also manages many other temples in Tirupati and all around the world. The temples include both historical and new temples which were constructed by TTD itself.

Departments
TTD has almost all the departments that would be in a government, including production (laddus), engineering (dams and roads), water supply, human resources, transport, procurement and marketing, finance and accounting, public relations, information technology, forest and gardens, educational institutions and hospitals, revenue and general administration.

Services
TTD provides various services for pilgrims to Tirumala and Tirupati, including bus services, food and accommodation. It maintains the queue management system, facilitates head tonsure and distribution of laddu. It runs information and ticketing centers in the major towns and cities across the country. It maintains various marriage halls, degree colleges, junior colleges and high schools. Sri Venkateswara Central Library and Research Centre (SVCLRC), established by TTD in 1993, houses approximately 40,000 volumes of books, mainly on religion and philosophy. The Research Wing works towards studying and publishing material related to the Hindu religion, produces authentic papers on original Sanskrit texts, and provide translations of major Hindu works in regional languages, Hindi and English. Dharma Prachara Parishad was established to propagate the Hindu dharma. TTD also helps promote the age-old cultural heritage of India, in the areas of traditional sculpture and architecture, temple renovation and reconstructions and restoration of Hindu sculptures. Complex queueing algorithms and emerging technologies have been evaluated and implemented to manage the huge crowds with Tata Consultancy Services designing and implementing the software and hardware infrastructure for queue management along with other companies.

Annaprasadam
The food offerings as "Annaprasadams" are being undertaken by TTD in a massive way in the Matrusri Tarigonda Vengamamba Annaprasadam Complex, donated by Matrsuri Tarigonda Ananta Koti Raju at Tirumala, in all the waiting queue lines and compartments of Vaikuntam Queue Complex I and II, footpath routes etc.

In Tirupati and Tiruchanur also the distribution of free food as "Annaprasadam" is being made to not less than 15,000 devotees.

Donations given by devotees equal nearly 130 million every month. Auctions of human hair fetched a revenue of  150 crores in 2011 and  203 crores in 2012. Temple admission ticket sales fetched a revenue of $25 million in 2007. Laddu, a confectionery, is offered as Lord's prasadam. TTD has procured machines from MICO BOSCH to automate the manufacture of laddus. Sale of laddus fetched a revenue of staggering $10 million in 2007.

Education
 Sri Venkateswara Vedic University, Tirumala
 Sri Venkateswara Arts College, Tirupati
 Sri Venkateswara Institute of Traditional Sculpture and Architecture, Tirupati
 Sri Venkateswara College of Music and Dance, Tirupati
 Sri Venkateswara Ayurvedic College, Tirupati
 Sri Venkateswara Yoga Institute, Tirupati
 Sri Venkateswara Polytechnic for the Physically Challenged (SVPPC), Tirupati
 Sri Padmavati Mahila Visvavidyalayam (SPMVV), Tirupati
 Sri Venkateswara Government Polytechnic College, Tirupati
 Sri Padmavathi Mahila Polytechnic College, Tirupati
 Sri Venkateswara College, New Delhi

Hospitals
TTD acts as a major stake holder in the following hospitals
 Sri Venkateswara Ramnarain Ruia Government General Hospital
 Sri Venkateswara Institute of Medical Sciences 
 Government Maternity Hospital, Tirupati

Sri Venkateswara Gosamrakshana Shala

It is home for cattle received as a donation (Godanam). It was established in the year 1956 by TTD and later renamed to S.V. Gosamrakshana Shala during 2004. It is located at Chandragiri Road, Tirupati. It is maintained by Tirumala Tirupati Devasthanams based on the funds received under Sri Venkateswara Gosamrakshana Shala Trust. Activities of the trust include providing a good environment, management, and food to the cattle. The milk and its products produced here are used by TTD for daily rituals at Sri Venkateswara Temple and other TTD temples.

Free bus services
TTD runs free buses from the Tirupati railway station and bus station to Alipiri and Srivari Mettu, every 30 minutes. Pilgrims who intend to walk up the hills to Tirumala use these buses. TTD also provides free bus services within Tirumala town, which are known as "Dharma Rathams". There are 12 such buses that pass through cottages, choultries, temples and other places in Tirumala, at a frequency of every 3 minutes in the prescribed time slots.

Controversies

Civet Controversy
The civet is an endangered animal that first appeared in historic texts during the 12th century. In these texts, it was depicted that kings would be bathed in the oil created from the secretion of these cats, called Punugu oil, for aromatic purposes. In the 14th century the oil became known as a prestigious perfume. In the 21st century, the temple has used this oil to anoint the sacred image of Sri Venkateswara every Friday. Due to the weekly occurrence of this practice, the TTD reared nine of these civets in the Sri Venkateswara dairy farms to easily collect the secretions. In 2002, due to the endangered nature of the animals, this practice came under fire. The topic cropped up again in 2008, this time accompanied by the confiscation of their civets due to the violation of the 1972 Wildlife Protection Act. The temple tried to re-obtain the civets by stating that without these animals it would go against their ageless religious practices. If that plan failed, they had hopes of funding a zoo refuge for these animals and in turn be able to collect their secretions.

Further reading
 Growth and Development of Tirumala-Tirupati as a Dimension of Indian Civilization, by Talapaneni Subramanyam Naidu, Anthropological survey of India. Published by Anthropological Survey of India, Ministry of Human Resource Development, Dept. of Culture, Govt. of India, 1990.
 A Study of Tirumala-Tirupati Devasthanams Educational Institutions: Higher Education, by P. Krishna Murthy. Published by P. Krishna Murthy, 1984.

Founder history
Ghati Deva Yadavaraya, Veera Narasingadeva Yadavaraya, Veera Rakshasa Yadavaraya and Ranganatha Yadavaraya

Media 
 Sri Venkateswara Bhakti Channel
 Sapthagiri Magazine

See also
 Alamelu Mangapuram
 Tirumala Brahmotsavalu
 Hindu Endowments Board

References

External links
 TTD Temple official website

 
 
Hindu organisations based in India
Tirumala Venkateswara Temple
Religious organizations established in 1932
1932 establishments in India